The 2020 New Zealand general election held on Saturday, 17 October 2020 determined the membership of the 53rd New Zealand Parliament. It was previously scheduled for 19 September, before being delayed due to the COVID-19 pandemic. Parliament has 120 seats, and 72 will be filled by electorate MPs, with the remaining 48 from ranked party lists. Parties were required to submit their party lists to the Electoral Commission by 17 September and the lists were publicly released on 19 September,  though some parties published their lists earlier than that. This page lists candidates by party, including their ranking on a list.

Successful parties

ACT Party
ACT New Zealand released the first 20 places on its list on 28 June 2020. On 6 July, Stephen Berry, contesting Pakuranga and ranked ninth on the list, withdrew his candidacy for health reasons. The remainder of the list, with candidates ranked in alphabetical order, was released by the Electoral Commission on 19 September 2020.

Green Party
The Green Party has a two-stage process to determine its party list, a process that they claim is "the most democratic list selection process in the country". The initial list is determined by attendees of the annual Green Party conference, which was held during February 2020. In a departure from previous practice, the initial list was not publicly released, but media company Stuff published a partial list on 9 April 2020.

The initial list was finalised through voting by all party members and was to be expected in early June. The first 24 positions of the final list were reported by The New Zealand Herald on 24 May.

Labour Party
The Labour Party released its list on 15 June 2020. On 4 July, Kurt Taogaga was removed from his position at 68th on the list after past tweets were resurfaced in which he praised an Islamophobic column written by NZ First MP Richard Prosser. On 21 July, incumbent list MP Raymond Huo, who had been placed at 26th on the list, announced that he would not contest the election. On 22 July, Iain Lees-Galloway, 13th on the list, announced he would retire after being removed from his ministerial roles for inappropriate workplace relations.

National Party
The National Party released its list on 8 August 2020.

Māori Party 
The Māori Party released its list on 28 August 2020.

Unsuccessful parties

Advance NZ
Advance NZ shares a joint party list between its four component parties, the New Zealand Public Party, the New Zealand People's Party, Direct Democracy New Zealand and Reset NZ. The full list was published on 18 September 2020.

Heartland NZ

Legalise Cannabis Party

New Conservative Party
The New Conservative Party released their full list on 18 September 2020.

New Zealand First 
New Zealand First released its list on 17 September 2020.

ONE Party

The Opportunities Party

Outdoors Party

Social Credit Party
The Social Credit Party had 23 list candidates.

Sustainable New Zealand Party

TEA Party

Vision NZ

See also

 Candidates in the 2020 New Zealand general election by electorate

References

Notes

2020 New Zealand general election
Lists of New Zealand political candidates
Party lists